Peter Goodchild CChem FRSC (born 18 August 1939) is a former BBC television editor, who notably edited Horizon and who initiated the popular 1980s BBC science series Q.E.D..

Early life
He studied at St John's College, Oxford.  Before Oxford, he was a student at Aldenham, located near Elstree, Herts.

Career

BBC
He joined the BBC's Horizon, becoming a producer from 1965-69. From 1969-76 he was Editor of Horizon, at the time the series was much in its heyday and essential viewing for many people. Under him, it won a BAFTA award (British Academy Television Awards) in 1972 and 1974 for Best Factual Series.

He was executive producer of the BAFTA Award winning series Marie Curie (1977) and Oppenheimer (1980).

From 1980-84 he was BBC Television's Head of Science & Features; in this position he created QED. From 1984-89 he branched out, away from science, becoming BBC Television's Head of Plays; in this position, he created Screen One, Screen Two and Screenplay. From 1989-94 he was an executive producer in the BBC Film department.

Playwright
Goodchild wrote several plays for L.A. Theatre Works.

References

External links
 Talking about his time at Horizon
 

1939 births
Alumni of St John's College, Oxford
BBC executives
BBC television producers
Fellows of the Royal Society of Chemistry
Horizon (British TV series)
Living people